Seven Keys is a 1962 British crime thriller directed by Pat Jackson and starring Alan Dobie.

Plot
Alan Dobie plays a convict who is bequeathed a set of seven keys by a fellow prisoner. After discovering that the deceased was an embezzler who stole £20,000 that was never recovered; he sets out to find the cash after finishing the last three months of his sentence. However, he must first solve the mystery of which locks the keys fit and run the gauntlet of the police and a number of gangsters who are after him and the money.

Cast
 Alan Dobie as Russell
 Jeannie Carson as Shirley Steele
 Delphi Lawrence as Natalie Worth
 John Carson as Norman
 John Lee as Jefferson
 Anthony Nicholls as Prison Governor
 Robertson Hare as Mr. Piggott
 Fabia Drake as Mrs. Piggott
 Alan White as Prison Warder
 Colin Gordon as Mr. Barber
 Peter Barkworth as Estate Agent
 Barbara Evans as Freddy's Wife
 John Horsley as Police Sergeant
 Jeremy Lloyd as Freddy
 Timothy Bateson as Bank Teller (uncredited)
 Victor Brooks as Discharging Officer (uncredited)
 Philip Locke as Norman's Thug (uncredited)

Critical reception
TV Guide described it as a "well-worn crime picture...A tame entry directed by former World War II documentarian Jackson, whose later works failed to make any impact on audiences". Britmovie wrote, "Pat Jackson, who made his name with such wartime documentaries as Western Approaches, intelligently directed this ingenious low-budget crime drama."

References

External links
 
 

1961 films
1960s crime thriller films
British crime thriller films
British prison drama films
Films directed by Pat Jackson
1960s prison films
1960s English-language films
1960s British films